The Radisson Collection Hotel, Royal Copenhagen is a historic hotel in Copenhagen, Denmark.

History
The hotel was designed by Danish architect and designer Arne Jacobsen for the airline Scandinavian Airlines System (SAS). It was opened on July 1, 1960 by King Frederick IX and Queen Ingrid as the Royal Hotel. It was also known as the SAS Royal Hotel. The hotel was renamed the Radisson SAS Royal Hotel in 1994, when SAS signed a joint marketing agreement with Radisson Hotels. When SAS and Radisson ceased the marketing agreement in February 2009, the hotel remained with Radisson and was renamed the Radisson Blu Royal Hotel. On March 6, 2018 it was renamed Radisson Collection Hotel, Royal Copenhagen.

At its completion the hotel was the largest in Denmark. At 69.60 meters in height, it was the first skyscraper in Copenhagen, and until 1969, the tallest high-rise building in Denmark. In 2009, it was the country's seventh-highest tower.

Design
The entire hotel – from the exterior façade through to the stainless-steel cutlery used in the restaurant and the Swan and Egg chairs gracing the lobby – was designed by the Danish architect Arne Jacobsen. Since most of his work has been replaced by corporate standard fabrics and furniture, the hotel has been referred to as Jacobsens' Lost Gesamtkunstwerk. Only a single room has been kept in the original design. It has all of the original, green furniture and the wood panels on the wall. This room, with the number 606, is no longer available for booking but guests can request a tour.

Shades of green dominate the entire design. Jacobsen, who was also working as a landscape architect 1955-1960, pursued a "modern garden" theme. He implemented this theme using green textiles and furniture combined with "organic shapes" and rigid geometric forms.

Jacobsen has created several furniture, lighting and textile designs. Some models were later adopted into mass production and have become design classics, which are exhibited in museums worldwide. Others, however, remained unique pieces.

During the design phase sketches of the building were published in Danish newspapers. Critics feared a destruction of the traditional skyline of Copenhagen. The building was compared to a punch card. Jacobsen's response was, "it’s funny, for that is actually what it looks like when the windows are open on a hot summer’s day." Another term used was introduced by Jacobsen's former associate Erik Møller, who called it the "glass cigarbox". The promoter of the international style, Philip C. Johnson, said it was the worst copy of Lever House. Jacobsen responded: "At least, it came in first when they held a competition for the ugliest building in Copenhagen."

Structure

The structure is twenty stories high and a defining characteristic of Copenhagen's skyline. The structure was inspired by  New York  Park Avenue structures, namely Skidmore, Owings %26 Merrill's Lever House. The building's sense of lightness emanates from its Lever House-inspired form with a two-story base supporting its lofty "punch card" tower.

The reinforced concrete frame structure erected in the tower has a curtain wall of aluminum profiles and transparent green and gray anodized glass. The windows can be opened to the inside stories in all. The horizontal distance between the aluminum profiles is 60 cm. Vertical take turns green glass followed by 168 cm 120 cm window is installed. The curtain wall construction Jacobsen at the three-story City Hall was first used in 1955 Rødovre Denmark. The hotel façade differs only from the City Hall by the light-green colour of the intermediate elements and some slightly different proportions.

Location
It is located in the heart of the city, in the Vesterbro district, close to Tivoli and Copenhagen Central Station. On a road island outside the hotel is the "Freedom Statue", commemorating the abolition of serfdom in Denmark.

Gallery

References

External links
 Official Website
 Pictures from a reconstruction of one of the Royal Hotel rooms 

Arne Jacobsen buildings
Hotel buildings completed in 1960
Hotels in Copenhagen
Radisson Hotels
Hotels established in 1960
Modernist architecture in Copenhagen
Vesterbro, Copenhagen
Skyscrapers in Denmark
Skyscraper hotels
Rezidor Hotel Group